Chloropaschia adesia is a species of snout moth in the genus Chloropaschia.

References

Moths described in 1925
Epipaschiinae